Dulwich International High School Suzhou (DHSZ) is a private high school located in Suzhou Industrial Park, Suzhou, China, along with its sister school Dulwich College Suzhou (DCSZ). 

The school has approximately 800 students enrolled, age from 14 - 19. Dulwich has a global school network. Edward Allen established the first Dulwich College in London on June 21, 2019. After the school's directors decided to open the first International school in Shanghai in 2003, the school continued to expand its network in Asia, including Beijing, Zhuhai, and Seoul. 

So far, there are seven DCI (Dulwich College International) in countries worldwide. Dulwich International High School Suzhou, which opened in 2012, is the Dulwich family's sixth school. Until its new facilities were completed, DHSZ rented space on the Suzhou High School campus. DHSZ relocated to Suzhou Industrial Park in the summer of 2015.

Contact 
Location: 360, Fangzhong Street, SIP, Suzhou, Jiangsu, PR China (港田路360号）

Post Code: 215021

Curriculum 
DHSZ offers two distinct programs, one of which is a three-year program with only one year of IGCSE and the other of which includes two years of IGCSE.

DHSZ is a private international high school in Suzhou and it doesn’t follow the Chinese local education system. Instead, it uses the British system.IGSCE (International General Certificate of Secondary Education) courses for year 10-11 students and A-level (Cambridge International AS & A Levels) courses for year 12-13 students. All of the teachers are from different countries, and the students are educated entirely in English. 

Compulsory courses include English, Chinese, Mathematics, Lifeskills, Drama and PE. Selective courses include economics, computer science, psychology, geography, arts, music, physics, chemistry, and biology. Students must choose different combinations of selective courses based on their interests or their planned future majors.

Boarding 
The school provides boarding for approximately 300 students.

All termly boarders live onsite in the Alleyn House (DHSZ/DCSZ Boarding House). The boarding house have separate wings for girls and boys. Rooms are shared between 2 and 4 students.

The weekly boarders live in the Shackleton / Bancroft House approximately one kilometer away from the campus. Students are being transported using school buses.

See also 
 Dulwich College
 Dulwich College Beijing
 Dulwich College Seoul
 Dulwich College Shanghai
 Dulwich College Singapore
 Dulwich College Suzhou
 Dulwich International High School Zhuhai

External links
Dulwich International High School Suzhou
Dulwich Olympiad

References 

Educational institutions established in 2012
High schools in Suzhou
International schools in Suzhou
British international schools in China
Suzhou Industrial Park
2012 establishments in China